Haberman is a surname of Germanic origin. People with the name include:
Clyde Haberman (born 1945), American journalist
Daniel Haberman (1933–1991), American poet
Hardy Haberman (born 1950), American author, filmmaker, educator, designer
Maggie Haberman (born 1973), American journalist
Mandy Haberman (contemporary) (born 1954), English inventor and entrepreneur, inventor of the Haberman feeder
Martin Haberman (contemporary) (1932–2012), American educator, university dean, and author; eponym of The Haberman Educational Foundation
Richard Haberman (contemporary), American mathematician
Robert Haberman (contemporary), Romanian-American socialist lawyer and left-wing activist; Mexican government minister
Seth Haberman (born 1960), American developer of viewer-customized television advertising
Steven Haberman (born 1951), English professor of actuarial science

Locations
Haberman station a former Long Island Rail Road station

Germanic-language surnames
Occupational surnames
Jewish surnames